Morrison Flight Park  is a private use ultralight airport in Greene County, Indiana, United States. It is located two nautical miles (4 km) southwest of the central business district of Linton, Indiana, and was previously a public use airport.

Facilities and aircraft 
Morrison Flight Park resides at elevation of 520 feet (158 m) above mean sea level. It has one runway designated 18U/36U with a turf surface measuring 1,225 by 70 feet (373 x 21 m).

For the 12-month period ending December 31, 2003, the airport had 420 general aviation aircraft operations, an average of 35 per month. There are four ultralight aircraft based at this airport.

See also 
 List of airports in Indiana

References

External links 
 Aerial photo as of April 1998 from USGS The National Map
 

Airports in Indiana
Transportation buildings and structures in Greene County, Indiana
Ultralight aviation